is a train station on the Hankyu Kyoto Line. It was opened on 16 March 2003, and serves the communities nestled between Katsura and Mukō.

Layout
The elevated station has two side platforms serving two tracks. Both platforms are connected by stairs, elevators and escalators with the ground level where a ticket gate is located.

History
Rakusaiguchi Station opened on 16 March 2003. 

Station numbering was introduced to all Hankyu stations on 21 December 2013 with this station being designated as station number HK-80.

Until the work to elevate the tracks was completed on 5 March 2016, each platform had its own ticket gate.  From 26 October 2013 to 4 March 2016, only -bound platform was on the elevated track.

Usage
In fiscal 2015 (April 2015 to March 2016), about 4,525,000 passengers used this station annually. For historical data, see the table below.

Stations next to Rakusaiguchi

References

External links
Rakusaiguchi Station from Hankyu Railway website 

Hankyu Kyoto Main Line
Railway stations in Kyoto
Railway stations in Japan opened in 2003